Henrietta Butler, Viscountess Galmoye, previously Henrietta Waldegrave, Baroness Waldegrave (née Lady Henrietta FitzJames; 1667 – 3 April 1730), was an illegitimate daughter of James Stuart, Duke of York, subsequently King of England, Scotland and Ireland, by his mistress, Arabella Churchill (a sister of the first Duke of Marlborough). Upon marrying she became Lady Waldegrave, and then with her second marriage Viscountess Galmoye, as well as Countess of Newcastle (in the Jacobite Peerage).

Early life and marriage
She was the older sister of the celebrated James FitzJames, 1st Duke of Berwick. She was brought up a Roman Catholic and married into a family of the same religion. On 29 November 1683, she married Henry Waldegrave, 1st Baron Waldegrave, and by him had two children:
Arabella Waldegrave
James Waldegrave, 1st Earl Waldegrave.

Later life
She accompanied her father and his wife in their exile and lived some years at Saint-Germain-en-Laye in France. After her husband's death in 1689, she was involved with an Irish soldier, Mark Talbot. 

She subsequently married Piers Butler, 3rd Viscount Galmoye, on 3 April 1695. He had been created Earl of Newcastle in the Jacobite Peerage in 1692. The marriage was childless. She died in 1730 and was buried in Navestock.

Ancestry

References 
The peerage page

1667 births
1730 deaths
Henrietta FitzJames
Henrietta FitzJames
Illegitimate children of James II of England
Henrietta FitzJames
English Roman Catholics
17th-century English women
18th-century English women
17th-century English nobility
18th-century English people
Waldegrave
Galmoye
Daughters of kings